In mathematics, Gaussian brackets are a special notation invented by Carl Friedrich Gauss to represent the convergents of a simple continued fraction in the form of a simple fraction. Gauss used this notation in the context of finding solutions of the indeterminate equations of the form .

This notation was also invented by Gauss and was used in the third proof of the quadratic reciprocity law.

The notation
The Gaussian brackets notation is defined as follows:

The expanded form of the expression  can be described thus: "The first term is the product of all n members; after it come all possible products of (n -2) members in which the numbers have alternately odd and even indices in ascending order, each starting with an odd index; then all possible products of (n-4) members likewise have successively higher alternating odd and even indices, each starting with an odd index; and so on. If the bracket has an odd number of members, it ends with the sum of all members of odd index; if it has an even number, it ends with unity."

With this notation, one can easily verify that

Properties

 The bracket notation can also be defined by the recursion relation: 
 The notation is symmetric or reversible in the arguments: 
 The Gaussian brackets expression can be written by means of a determinant:  
 The notation satisfies the determinant formula: 
 
 Let the elements in the Gaussian bracket expression be alternatively 0. Then

Applications

The Gaussian brackets have been used extensively by optical designers as a time-saving device in computing the effects of changes in surface power, thickness, and separation of focal length, magnification, and object and image distances.

References

Additional reading
The following papers give additional details regarding the applications of Gaussian brackets in optics.

 
 

Carl Friedrich Gauss
Continued fractions